The leptotene stage, also known as the leptonema, is the first of five substages of prophase I in meiosis.  The term leptonema derives from Greek words meaning "thin threads". A cell destined to become a gamete enters the leptotene stage after its chromosomes are duplicated during interphase.  During the leptotene stage those duplicated chromosomes—each consisting of two sister chromatids—condense from diffuse chromatin into long, thin strands that are more visible within the nucleoplasm.  The next stage of prophase I in meiosis is the zygotene stage.

During this stage, the chromosomes attach themselves by their ends (telomeres) to the inner membrane of the nuclear envelope. At the transition to the zygotene stage the telomeres usually aggregate at a nuclear envelope sector, thereby forming a meiotic bouquet. Lateral (axial) elements of the synaptonemal complex are also formed. It is the first stage of Prophase 1 in Meiosis 1.

Immediately after DNA damaging treatment (gamma irradiation) during male mouse meiosis, it is possible to distinguish two types of DNA  repair response.  From the leptotene stage to early pachytene, exogenous DNA damage triggers the massive presence of gammaH2AX throughout the cell nucleus, which is associated with DNA repair mediated by the homologous recombination proteins DMC1 and RAD51.  From mid-pachytene to diplotene the predominant DNA repair pathway is non-homologous end joining.

See also
Synizesis (biology)

References 

Cellular processes